The Betrothed (Italian:  I promessi sposi) is a 1989 Italian television miniseries starring Burt Lancaster and Franco Nero.  It was directed by Salvatore Nocita, based on the 19th-century historical novel of the same name by Alessandro Manzoni.

Plot
Set between 1629 and 1631, the adaptation tells the story of Renzo Tramaglino and Lucia Mondella, Lombard commoners forced to separate and endure a thousand vicissitudes due to the arrogance of the lord Don Rodrigo. However, during their journey they will find various people willing to help them, from Fra Cristoforo to the Innominato (first cruel and then converted), from Federigo Borromeo to Donna Prassede.

Cast

Reception
The final episode had an audience of 12 million viewers in Italy.

References 
Burt Lancaster. Da qui all'eternità, by Robyn Karney, A. S. Farina

External links 

1989 drama films
1989 Italian television series debuts
1989 Italian television series endings
1989 television films
1989 films
Films scored by Ennio Morricone
Films based on works by Alessandro Manzoni
Italian-language television
Italian television films
1980s Italian television miniseries
Television shows based on Italian novels
Television series set in the 17th century
Films directed by Salvatore Nocita